Richard Mclean Giese (born February 9, 1990), known professionally as Social Repose, is an American singer-songwriter and YouTube personality.

YouTube channel and artistry 
Richie Giese began his YouTube channel, Social Repose, in April 2011, where he uploaded his original music. He later began posting vlogs, cover songs, comedy sketches and other content. As time progressed, he began posting barbershop-style a cappella covers as well as loop covers and more humorous music content, while still continuing to upload his original music. His other musical content includes videos of him performing songs in other genres, making songs from other YouTubers' Tweets and singing while inhaling helium. Social Repose also uploads reaction videos, which he titles "Goth reacts", and surreal artistic videos. His YouTube channel currently has over 1 million subscribers.

When performing, he wears a distinct outfit that includes mechanical wings, face paint and a  headdress that resembles a Native American war bonnet for which he has received widespread criticism. He progressively adds new components to his outfit, which he tends to get custom-made. He claims that the outfit is meant to be memorable and garner attention to his music. He likes to describe his style as "alternative".

Musical career 
Prior to 2015, Social Repose made emo electronic and synth-pop music which he released independently through YouTube and Bandcamp.

He began his musical career in 2011 making synth-pop music. He made his first song, "Helium House", while still in film school. The accompanying video is the first upload on his YouTube channel. The song was included on his first album, Paradise. He regards this portion of his career as "cringey".

In 2013, Social Repose started making EDM songs. Reckless Closure was his first EDM album. He released an EP titled Crazy Manic Love, which includes a song of the same name.

Social Repose's debut album, Yalta, was released in 2015. This featured a completely new style, and was a "transitional record" for him. It is considered alternative or indie, and has been compared to the sounds of Owl City and Panic! at the Disco.

Social Repose has collaborated with musician BryanStars on an a capella cover of Bring Me the Horizon's "Follow You".

Social Repose released a song called "Filthy Pride" in 2016 as a single before it was included on his EP, Empress. He wrote the rest of the EP around this song, because he felt like its theme needed to be expanded on. He intended Empress to have the same dark, atmospheric sound as Yalta. He released a music video for his song "Villain", which served as the second track on the EP.'Social Repose embarked on the Empress Tour, spanning the southern and mid-west United States. Hotel Books and the Funeral Portrait served as support. The tour then went overseas to the United Kingdom and Europe, with One-Eyed Doll.

In 2018, Social Repose's cover of "You Should See Me in a Crown" was featured on Glamour magazine's YouTube channel, where it was watched by Billie Eilish. She complimented him on his talent and described the video as "impressive".

Social Repose's album Calamity was released on March 26, 2020.

 Discography 

 Albums and EPs 
 Paradise (2011)
 More of the Same (2011)
 The Modern Age (2012)
 The Machine That Learned How to Love (2012)
 Reckless Closure (2013)
 Crazy Manic Love (2014)
 Just Let Me Go (2014)
 Covers (2015)
 Yalta (2015)
 Empress (2017)
 Calamity (2020)

 Singles 
 "Summertime Sadness" (Lana Del Rey cover) (2013)
 "I Can't Sleep" (2015)
 "If You're Thinking of Leaving, You Should." (2015)
 "True Friends (Acappella)" (2015)
 "Stitches (a cappella cover)" (2015)
 "Pity Party (Acappella)" (2016)
 "Control (Acappella)" (2016)
 "We Don't Have to Dance (Acappella)" (2016)
 "Stressed Out (Acappella)" (2016)
 "Cake (Acappella)" (2016)
 "Follow You (Acappella)" [feat. Bryanstars] (2016)
 "I Miss You" [feat. Johnnie Guilbert] (2016)
 "Heathens (Acappella)" (2016)
 "Lane Boy (Acappella)" (2016)
 "Circles (Acappella)" (2016)
 "Lost Boy (Loop Acappella)" (2016)
 "Tag You're It (Acappella)" (2016)
 "Dollhouse (Acappella)" (2016)
 "Mad Hatter (Acappella)" (2016)
 "Closer (Acappella)" (2016)
 "Million Reasons (Acappella)" (2016)
 "We Don't Believe What's on TV (Acappella)" (2016)
 "Filthy Pride" (2016)
 "Filthy Pride (SunRoof remix)" (2016)
 "Mrs. Potato Head (Acappella)" (2016)
 "Starboy (loop version)" (2016)
 "Fake Love (Acappella)" (2017)
 "Paris (Acappella)"  (2017)
 "Carousel (Acappella)" (2017)
 "LA Devotee (Acappella)" (2017)
 "Shape of You (Acappella)" (2017)
 "Something Just like This (Acappella)" (2017)
 "Basket Case (Acappella)" (2017)
 "Hard Times (Acappella)" (2017)
 "Girls / Girls / Boys (Acappella)" (2017)
 "Something Just like This (Acappella)" (2017)
 "Eyes Closed (Acappella)" (2017)
 "Numb (Acappella)" (2017)
 "Heavy (Acapella)" (2017)
 "I'm Not Okay (Acapella)" (2017)
 "Don't Threaten Me with a Good Time (Acapella)" (2017)
 "Cute without the E (Cut From the Team)" (2017)
 "Pacify Her (Acapella)" (2017)
 "Emperor's New Clothes (Acapella)" (2018)
 "I Fall Apart (Acapella)" (2018)
 "I Want to Be Happy" (2018)
 "Moving On" (2018)
 "Lowlife" (2018)
 "IDGAF" (2018)
 "Africa (Acapella)" (2018)
 "Stay Alive" (2018)
"Psycho (Acapella)" (2018)
"Stay (Acapella)" (2018)
"Sad!" (2018)
"I Beg for the End" (2018)
"Nico and the Niners (Acapella)" (2018)
"You Should See Me in a Crown" (2018)
"Ocean Eyes" (2018)
"Save That Shit" (2018)
"Slow Dancing in the Dark" (2018)
"My Blood" (2018)
"Self Care" (2018)
"Falling Down" (2018)
"Lovely" (2018)
"When the Party's Over" (2018)
"Mr. Brightside" (2018)
"Test Drive" (2018)
"Lying Is the Most Fun a Girl Can Have Without Taking Her Clothes Off" (2018)
"Hostage" (2018)
"BAD!" (2018)
"Mercy Kill" (2018)
"Unravel" (2019)
"The Hero (Acapella)" (2019)
"Silhouette (Acapella)" (2019)
"Bury a Friend" (2019)
"Weight of the World" (2019)
"Bad Guy" (2019)
"Parents" (2019)

 Tours 
 The Yalta Tour (2016)
The Empress Tour (2017–2018)
The Twenty-Ninescene Tour (2019)

 Filmography 
 Shane and Friends (2017)
 The Skeptic's Guide to Wellness (2017)
 The Andy Show'' (2017)

References

External links 

American atheists
21st-century atheists
Living people
YouTube channels launched in 2011
American YouTubers
21st-century American singers
Place of birth missing (living people)
American male songwriters
American ukulele players
21st-century American pianists
American indie pop musicians
Art pop musicians
Avant-pop musicians
A cappella musicians
American electronic musicians
21st-century American male singers
1990 births
Music YouTubers